Megachile apicata is a species of bee in the family Megachilidae. It was described by Frederick Smith in 1853.

References

Apicata
Insects described in 1853